Sound Wave is Taiwanese Mandopop artist Stanley Huang's first compilation album. It was released between  Your Side (妳身邊) and Stan Up. This album has including four new songs and 16 previously released tracks. It was issued on 23 November 2003.

A DVD Karaoke Version Sound Wave (New Song + Collection) (音浪 新歌+精選) was released on 6 January 2004 which featuring fourteen music videos (3 new songs and 11 previous tracks).

Track listing
New tracks are in bold

Disc 1
預言 (Yu Yan)
馬戲團猴子 (Ma Shi Tuan Hou Zi) - Circus Monkey
狀元 (Zhuang Yuan)
不斷跳舞 (Bu Duan Tiao Wu)
流浪狗 (Liu Lang Gou) - Doggie Style
少林傳奇 (Shao Lin Chuan Qi)
八卦 (Ba Qua) - Gossip King
Machi
我的夢中情人 (Wo De Meng Zhong Qing Ren) - My Dream Girl
心內有鬼 (Xin Nei You Gui) - Show Me Your Demons

Disc 2
音浪 (Yin Lang) - Sound Wave
Let It Go feat. Elva Hsiao
分開旅行 (Feng Kai Lu Xing) feat. Rene Liu
你身邊 (Ni Shen Bian) - Your Side
Leave Me Alone
冷水澡 (Leng Shui Zao)
Help
迷航記 (Mi Hang Ji) - Lost At Sea
尋找 (Xun Zhao) - Looking For You
睡 (Shui)

DVD Karaoke
預言
馬戲團猴子 - Circus Monkey
狀元
不斷跳舞
流浪狗 - Doggie Style
八卦 - Gossip King
我的夢中情人 - My Dream Girl
心內有鬼 - Show Me Your Demons
音浪 - Sound Wave
Let It Go feat. Elva Hsiao
分開旅行 feat. Rene Liu
你身邊 - Your Side
Leave Me Alone
冷水澡

References

2003 albums
Stanley Huang albums